Suki Lee is an American video game designer and computer programmer. She was one of the few female developers at Atari, Inc. in the early 1980s where she wrote the educational game Math Gran Prix for the Atari 2600 (1982) and Obelix (1983) for the same system. Afterward she worked as a project manager at Apple Computer.

Education
Lee received her bachelor's degree at San Jose State University with a major in general engineering.

Career 
Lee was hired by Atari after college in August 1981. She was there until 1984, when she started working for Cadtrak Corporation developing software user interfaces for petroleum plant layout. She also worked for Apple from 1986 to 1997, then later went to work at Palm, eCircle and WebTV until 1997. In late 2002, she resigned and continued working at Apple.

Games
 Math Gran Prix (Atari 2600, 1982)
 Obelix (1984)

Unreleased
 Donald Duck's Speedboat (1982)
 Miss Piggy's Wedding (1983)

Cultural impact
The artwork “Suki Lee: The Hidden Past” by Linda Lai, Yifan Lin and Amanda Zhu was inspired by the game Donald Duck's Speedboat.

References

External links
 Suki Lee at AtariWomen

Living people
Year of birth missing (living people)
American video game designers
American video game programmers
Women video game designers
Women video game programmers
Atari people